The Iron Grip Barbell Company is a manufacturer of commercial free weight equipment based in Santa Ana, California.

History
Founded in 1993, its website claims it is the only company that still manufactures a complete line of equipment in the United States. 

Iron Grip holds many patents, and is internationally known.

References

External links
Official Website
Adjustable Dumbbells Set

Weight training equipment